Marco Fertonani (born 8 July 1976 in Genoa) is an Italian professional road bicycle racer. In 2007, he tested positive for using testosterone.

Professional career
Fertonani tested positive for using testosterone during the 2007 Tour Méditerranéen and was immediately suspended by the team, although Fertonani has decided to fight the case, citing errors in the testing procedure at the laboratory.

Major results

2004
1st Stage 6 Tour of Qinghai Lake
6th Coppa Placci
2005
5th Overall Tour de Romandie 
2006
1st Stage 4 Vuelta a Castilla y León
2007
4th Overall Tour Méditerranéen

See also
 List of doping cases in cycling
List of doping cases in sport

References

External links 

Italian male cyclists
1976 births
Living people
Doping cases in cycling
Italian sportspeople in doping cases
Sportspeople from Genoa
Cyclists from Liguria
21st-century Italian people